Maksim Sergeyevich Khramtsov (born 4 February 2002) is a Russian football player who plays for FC Baltika Kaliningrad.

Club career
He made his debut in the Russian Football National League for FC Krasnodar-2 on 8 August 2021 in a game against FC SKA-Khabarovsk.

References

External links
 
 
 Profile by Russian Football National League

2002 births
Living people
Russian footballers
Association football defenders
FC Krasnodar-2 players
FC Baltika Kaliningrad players
Russian First League players
Russian Second League players